Against the Odds is a science fiction novel by Elizabeth Moon. It is her seventh and last novel set in the Familias Regnant fictional universe. It does not fall in either informal trilogy (the Heris Serrano and the Esmay Suiza trilogies); fittingly it does not focus on any particular character, instead a more general, almost kaleidoscopic perspective of the upheaval in the Familias Regnant, and the rise to power of a new and more capable Speaker. It can be seen as a conclusion to the series, resolving or at least making a good start at resolving many issues and peoples and ending as it does on a memorializing elegiac note.

Plot
The opening steps back to near the ending of Change of Command; the loyalists in the weapons lab on Copper Mountain (which planet has just been taken over by mutineers) have finished sending out their radio transmission, which unbeknownst to them will indeed be picked by an escaping loyalist Fleet warship, and are wondering what to do next. Their transportation is ruined, so they decide to steal one from the mutineers. They stage a series of movements and radio transmissions intended to convince the mutineers that the weapons labs are being progressively taken over by their own.

Disabled, the Bonar Tighe is easy prey. The loyalists are rescued. For her services to Fleet past and present, Cecelia jokingly demands to be made an Admiral - a nod to a running joke in the series where various Fleet underlings become convinced (by how they keep showing up in the thick of things) that either Cecelia or Heris is really a special operations undercover admiral ferreting out traitors for Fleet.

Finally at Rockhouse, Esmay meets up with Brun and her own father General Casimir Suiza, who had brought along with him all the necessary apparatus to transfer Esmay's status as LandBride to her cousin Luci.

Admiral Arash Livadhi this entire time has been growing increasingly uneasy. He had unfortunately been close to Lepescu when he was a younger officer, and fears every day that the investigation into the Lepescu-inspired mutineers will damn him as well; he is further compromised by the fact that his closest friend Jules had been a Benignity deep agent, who had solely manipulated him into breaking rules and then through blackmail into becoming a Benignity agent.

Livadhi takes off. His ship begins bouncing around the Familias, attempting to throw off followers. Suiza follows in her Rascal, and is hidden by Koutsoudas foxing the scans aboard Livadhi's cruiser. In the last system before the Benignity proper, Suiza powers up her weapons when she sees what is suspected to be a Benignity vessel entering the system.

2000 novels
Novels by Elizabeth Moon
2000 science fiction novels
Baen Books books